Kleomedes of Astypalaia was a famous Ancient Greek Boxer, who had a successful boxing career in the 5th century BC. In 496 or 492 BC however, during a boxing match that took place either the 71st or 72nd Olympic Games, Kleomedes killed his opponent Ikos of Epidauros using a Foul blow. Because of the latter offense, and not due to the killing of his opponent ━ which was not considered a punishable act, he was disqualified and heavily fined by the Hellanodikai judges.

Kleomedes mourned his loss greatly for putting a stain on his record, and while returning to his hometown Astypalaia, he stumbled upon the Gymnasium from which he first learned boxing, and in a fit of Mania, took his grief out on the school, which was inhabited by about 60 children, by pulling out a pillar supporting the schools roof, and purportedly killing at least 27 children. When the inhabitants of the city attempted to stone him for his actions, he fled into the local temple of Athena and hid in a ritual chest, nonetheless the angry mob swiftly chased him down and caught up to him, but when they opened the chest, he was gone. With great shock, his confused pursuers consulted the Oracle of Delphi, which told the people that Kleomedes had become an immortal Hero. From that moment onwards, the inhabitants of Astypalaia commemorated his legacy as one of a champion with annual sacrifices in his honor.

References

4th-century BC births
4th-century BC Greek people
5th-century BC Greek people
People from Astypalaia
Ancient Greek boxers
Greek male boxers
Ancient Olympic competitors